This Is Me is the second studio album by American singer Kierra "Kiki" Sheard. It was released by EMI Gospel on June 27, 2006 in the United States. Sheard reteamed with her brother J. Drew Sheard, Warryn Campbell and duo PAJAM to work on her sophomore album but also consulted new collaborators to write and produce on This Is Me, including PJ Morton, Antonio Neal, and Tommy Sims as well as Fred Jerkins III and his son Lil Freddie.

Upon release, the album earned generally mixed to positive reviews from music critics and became Sheard's second consecutive album to debut at number one on the US Billboard Top Gospel Albums, also reaching number 90 on the Billboard 200. Nominated for a Grammy Award for Best Contemporary R&B Gospel Album, This Is Me won a Dove Award for Urban Album of the Year at the 38th GMA Dove Awards in 2007.

Background
Upon announcing the then future release, Sheard commented that she "called the album This Is Me because its more of the music me and my friends listen to, says Kiki. I grew up in the church, hearing and singing traditional Gospel, which I still love and will always be a big part of who I am. But when the Clark Sisters, then later, artists like Kirk Franklin, and Mary Mary stepped out and put the Gospel message to a contemporary sound, a lot of people, particularly the young, realized this was music they could relate to, and when they were then willing to give it a listen, the message started getting through as well."

Critical reception

Allmusic editor Andree Farias found that This Is Me was less "calculated" than her debut album I Owe You (2004), writing: "It's more genuinely urban, befitting Sheard's age and sidestepping the ingratiatingly traditional side of I Owe You. As with most young performers, the disc is still handled by a bevy of producers and collaborators, but at least the songs never make Sheard sound out of character [...] Good for her: while This Is Me isn't always a smooth ride, it outdoes the debut in that it presents a more accurate picture of where she, not her family or her label, wants to head artistically."

This Is Me was met with mixed reaction from Sheard's core gospel fanbase. Where traditional gospel enthusiasts had a few tracks of that style to appease them on Kiki's debut project, her second album adopted an even more slick, contemporary sound. The only place the more trademark traditional "churchy" vocals appear are in the vamp of "No, Never". Nonetheless, scores of younger fans have been introduced to both traditional and contemporary gospel influences through Kiki Sheard's work. The artist herself stated that her goal with this album was to take the gospel message to a younger generation through songs that have a "beat they can associate with."

Accolades
The album was nominated for a Grammy Award for Best Contemporary R&B Gospel Album in December 2006, and album won a Dove Award for Urban Album of the Year at the 38th GMA Dove Awards in 2007.

Chart performance
Upon release, This Is Me became Sheard's second consecutive album to debut at number one on the US Billboard Top Gospel Albums chart, selling 11,000 copies in its first week — Sheard's best Nielsen Soundscan week at the time. In the US, it also reached number four on the Top Christian Albums, number 16 on the Top R&B/Hip-Hop Albums and number 90 on the Billboard 200.

Track listing

Charts

References

Kierra Sheard albums
2006 albums
EMI Records albums